San Carlos Bay is a bay in Florida, U.S.

San Carlos Bay may also refer to:

San Carlos Water, a bay or fjord in the Falkland Islands 
 San Carlos bay, San Carlos Nuevo Guaymas, Sonora, Mexico

See also
San Carlos (disambiguation)
, a U.S. Navy ship named for the bay